Dark Fusion is a horizontally-scrolling platform shooter published by Gremlin Graphics in 1988. Levels are divided into three zones: Combat zone, Alien zone, and Flight zone. To enter a new zone, the player must first find a fusion pod. In the combat zone, the player controls an astronaut who has to go through levels by using a space shotgun. In Alien/Flight Zone, the player controls a space ship - first, fights against a giant alien, after killing these aliens the player makes their way to the Flight zone fusion pod then flies carefully through to the next level.

Gameplay

Development

Reception

Dark Fusion received generally positive reviews from critics.

References

External links

1988 video games
Platform games
Amstrad CPC games
Amiga games
Commodore 64 games
ZX Spectrum games
Gremlin Interactive games
Video games scored by Ben Daglish
Video games developed in the United Kingdom